Boulia is an outback town and locality in the Shire of Boulia, Queensland, Australia.

The area is best known for sightings of the Min Min lights, mysterious shimmering lights that appear at night. The lights are said to be caused by atmospheric refraction that occurs when cold air is trapped below warmer air, a phenomenon known as Fata Morgana.

Geography 
Boulia is at the crossroads of a number of outback routes, including the Boulia Mount Isa Road (which goes north-west towards Mount Isa), the Selwyn Road (which goes north-east to Selwyn), the Winton Road, which goes east toward Winton), and the Boulia Bedourie Road (which goes south-west to Bedourie). The Donohue Highway coming from the Northern Territory joins the Boulia Mount Isa Road just outside of Boulia, which together with the Winton Road forms part of the Outback Way billed as "Australia's Longest Shortcut", a  gravel-and-bitumen road which runs between Laverton in Western Australia and Winton in Queensland.

Boulia is in the Channel Country. All watercourses in this area are part of the Lake Eyre drainage basin, and most will dry up before their water reaches Lake Eyre. Boulia lies on the Burke River, which was named after the explorer Robert O'Hara Burke who passed through the area with the Burke and Wills expedition in 1860. The river flows from the north-east to the south-east through the locality.

Although it is contrary to the locality boundary principles of the Queensland Government, the locality of Boulia is an "island" entirely surrounded by the locality of Wills.

Extensive grazing of beef cattle on native vegetation is the predominant industry. Boulia is at the heart of the Channel Country of western Queensland where, during rain events, channels running between the rivers and creeks of the region fill with water and spread that water over expansive areas. When it does rain heavily, the Mitchell grass plains respond magnificently and result in the Channel country around Boulia, being among the finest beef producing country in Australia.

The town has a grid layout with 6 roads running east–west and 5 running north–south. Herbert Street is the main street where most of the civic and commercial premises are located.

History

The town was named by surveyor Frederick Arthur Hartnell in 1882 and was derived from the name of the waterhole near the township called "bool-yo" in the Pitta Pitta language.

The township was gazetted in 1879. Boulia Post Office opened on 1 July 1879.

Boulia Provisional School opened on 7 October 1889. It became Boulia State School on 1 January 1909.

The Good Shepherd Catholic Church was built in 1955.

In 2019, the Boulia Outback Chapel was established in the former Anglican church building. It is part of the Baptist Church.

Climate
Boulia experiences a hot desert climate (Köppen: BWh, Trewartha: BWhl); with very hot summers with occasional rains; warm to hot, dry springs and autumns; and mild, dry winters.
Although even in June and July the average maximum is a warm to very warm , frosts are not unknown in the morning during these months, but do not occur in most years. However, when the monsoon is strong rainfall can be heavy: in January 1974 Boulia received  of rain, in March 1887 , and in March 1950 .

Events
The town hosts the Boulia Camel Races, the longest camel race (running a 1500m cup final) on the Australian camel racing circuit.

Each year at Easter, the Boulia Racecourse reserve plays host to a rodeo, campdrafting, and horse racing event which is a social highlight for the district.

During August drag races are held at the Boulia Airport which attracts an enthusiastic crowd.

Facilities

Boulia has a range of public facilities open to the community. These include a public library, public hall, sports complex, racecourse, the Min Min encounter tourist centre, museum, visitor information centre, and camel races.  The Boulia Shire Council operates a public library at 18 Burke Street.

An 18-hole golf course with sand greens is located on the Boulia Winton Road. Greens fees are not charged for the use of this course and a clubhouse with bar facilities is available.

Boulia has Australia's first three-dimensional zebra crossing which is based on an optical illusion. It is to improve road safety and also to be a tourist attraction. It was introduced in 2018 after Boulia Shire Council mayor Rick Britton saw similar crossings in Iceland, Malaysia, India, New Zealand and the United States on social media.

The Boulia branch of the Queensland Country Women's Association has its rooms at 61 Moonah Street.

Boulia Outback Chapel is at 49 Moonah Street.

The Good Shepherd Catholic Church is at 33 Moonah Street.

Education 
Boulia State School is a government primary (Early Childhood-6) school for boys and girls at Templeton Street. In 2017, the school had an enrolment of 27 students with 4 teachers and 4 non-teaching staff (3 full-time equivalent).

There are no secondary schools in Boulia. The nearest secondary schools are in Mount Isa and Winton, but these are too distant for a daily commute. The Spinifex State College in Mount Isa offers boarding facilities. Other boarding schools or distance education would be options for secondary schooling.

Mars
The name Boulia is used as a name for a crater on the planet Mars, specifically commemorating the town.

Heritage listings
Boulia has a number of heritage-listed sites, including:
 Pituri Street: Boulia Stone House

See also

 Boulia Airport

References

External links

 Shire website
 University of Queensland: Queensland Places: Boulia and Boulia Shire
 Town map of Boulia, 1974

Towns in Queensland
Shire of Boulia
1879 establishments in Australia
Populated places established in 1879
Localities in Queensland